The San Sebastián Municipality is one of the 18 municipalities (municipios) that makes up the Venezuelan state of Aragua and, according to the 2011 census by the National Institute of Statistics of Venezuela, the municipality has a population of 23,279.  The town of San Sebastián is the shire town of the San Sebastián Municipality.

Demographics
The San Sebastián Municipality, according to a 2007 population estimate by the National Institute of Statistics of Venezuela, has a population of 22,906 (up from 20,096 in 2000). This amounts to 1.4% of the state's population.

Government
The mayor of the San Sebastián Municipality is Carlos Guillermo Miranda Escobar, elected on October 31, 2004, with 43% of the vote.   He replaced Enrique Barrios shortly after the elections. The municipality is divided into one parishes; Capital San Sebastián.

See also
San Sebastián
Aragua
Municipalities of Venezuela

References

External links
sansebastiandelosreyes-aragua.gob.ve 

Municipalities of Aragua